The Girl in Blue is a 2010 Chinese television series starring Joe Chen, Roy Chiu and Feng Shaofeng. It is based on the novel of the same name by Fei Wo Si Cun. The series aired on Hunan Television from 4 June to 17 June 2010 for 32 episodes.

Synopsis
You Jiaqi is a manager at an advertising company. One day, she meets her ex-boyfriend Meng Heping by chance at a car promotional event. The encounter made them realize the importance of the other party in their hearts. Just when Heping wants to defy his Mom's wishes to reconcile the love between him and Jiaqi, his best friend Ruan Zhengdong starts to chase after Jiaqi fervently. However, the reason behind Zhengdong's actions hides a darker and deeper secret.

Cast 
 Joe Chen as You Jiaqi
 Roy Chiu as Ruan Zhengdong
 Feng Shaofeng as Meng Heping
 Lu Chen as Ruan Jiangxi
 Xu Xing as Jiang Yun
 Lin Xiujun as Xiao Yun 
 Cao Yanyan as Wang Shuxian
 Ji Jie as Xu Shifeng
 Wang Siwei as Zhou Jingan
 Li Shipeng as Guo Jin
 Zhao Liying as An An

Soundtrack

External links 
 Official website 

Chinese romance television series
2010 Chinese television series debuts
2010 Chinese television series endings
Hunan Television dramas
Television shows based on works by Fei Wo Si Cun
Television series by Huace Media